Fabien Pierre Aurélien Dominique Gilot (born 27 April 1984) is a French Olympic and world champion swimmer.

Early life
Gilot was born in Denain, France, to Michel and Yveline Gilot. He started by playing water polo, before switching to swimming.

Career
He collected the large majority of his medals in freestyle and medley relay events, and is the only swimmer featured in all the medalled French relay teams since 2003. He has been part of the French swimming team since the world championship of 2003 in Barcelona.

In 2002, he became the European Junior Double Champion in the 100m freestyle, with a time of 50.47 seconds, and the 200m freestyle, with a time of 1.52.30 minutes, in Linz, Austria. In 2003 he won a bronze medal as a member of the French 400m freestyle relay team at the World Aquatics Championships in Barcelona. In 2004 he won a bronze medal in the same event at the European Aquatics Championships in Madrid.

He swam for France at the 2008 Olympics, where he was part of France's silver medal winning 4 × 100 m freestyle relay. That year he also won a gold medal in the 200m freestyle relay at the European Championships.

In 2010, he won gold medals in the 200m freestyle relay at the European Aquatics Championships and the Short Course World Championships, a silver medal in the 100m freestyle at the Short Course World Championships in Dubai, and a bronze medal in 50m freestyle race at the European Championships in Budapest.  In 2011 he won silver medals in the 400m freestyle relay and the 800m freestyle relay at the World Aquatics Championships in Shanghai.

In the London 2012 Summer Olympics he again swam for France, and as part of France's team in the Men's 4 × 100 metre freestyle relay, shared in the team's gold medal. In his victory wave, Gilot revealed an underarm tattoo with three Hebrew words אני כלום בלעדיהם meaning: "I am nothing without them", which he explained was a tribute to his maternal grandmother's Jewish German-born husband Max Goldschmidt, an Auschwitz concentration camp Holocaust survivor.  Gilot said that this quote had a very special meaning for him, representing his family and three stars – one for each of his brothers, as well as for his Olympic appearances.  He described Goldschmidt as "a grandfather in every way".  Goldschmidt died in 2012, but was able to see his grandson's tattoo and his swimming achievements, although not his Olympic gold.

Starting in 2013, Gilot became the team captain of the French swimming team, at European Championships (Berlin 2014), World (Kazan 2015), and at the Olympics (Rio de Janeiro 2016). In 2013 Gilot became a double World Champion as a member of France’s 4×100 meter freestyle (3:11.18) and medley (3:31.51) relays at the FINA World Championships in Barcelona. In 2014, he won a silver medal in the 100m freestyle at the European Championships in Berlin. In 2015, he again won a gold medal at the FINA World Championships in the 4×100 meter freestyle (3:10.74), in Kazan, while his team won a bronze medal in the 4×100m medley relay (3:30.50).

In the 2016 Rio Olympics, Gilot and his 2015 world champion teammates won the silver medal in the 4 × 100 m freestyle relay (3:10.53).

Gilot will take part in the torch lighting ceremony at the 2017 Maccabiah Games on 6 July 2017.

References

External links
 
 
 
 
 
 
  

1984 births
Living people
People from Denain
French male freestyle swimmers
Olympic swimmers of France
Swimmers at the 2004 Summer Olympics
Swimmers at the 2008 Summer Olympics
Swimmers at the 2012 Summer Olympics
Swimmers at the 2016 Summer Olympics
Olympic gold medalists for France
Olympic silver medalists for France
World record holders in swimming
World Aquatics Championships medalists in swimming
Medalists at the FINA World Swimming Championships (25 m)
European Aquatics Championships medalists in swimming
Medalists at the 2012 Summer Olympics
Medalists at the 2008 Summer Olympics
European champions for France
Medalists at the 2016 Summer Olympics
Olympic gold medalists in swimming
Olympic silver medalists in swimming
Sportspeople from Nord (French department)
21st-century French people